Zhang Yuan (Chinese: 张远; pinyin: Zhāng Yuǎn; born 8 December 1989) is a Chinese footballer who currently plays as a right-back or right winger for Shenzhen FC.

Club career
Zhang Yuan would show a keen interest in baseball and football while in primary school, he chose to play football in the fifth grade and then systemly received football training in Renmin University High School. He was scouted by the Chinese under-20 national team manager Liu Chunming who recommended him to Chengdu Blades. Chengdu would transfer him into their squad at the beginning of the 2008 league season. His height and speed would see Zhang quickly included into the club's first team and he would make his league debut on 29 March 2008 against Liaoning Whowin in a 1-1 draw. Often used out on the wings to utilize his speed, Zhang would gain considerable playing time and go on to score his first league goal on 17 May 2008 against Changsha Ginde in a 1-1 draw. By the following season, Zhang was an established player within the first team, however the club were relegated to the second tier at the end of the 2009 league season when it was discovered that the club match-fixed several games in 2007 when the club won promotion. Zhang would decide to remain faithful towards the club and would go on to play in twenty-one games, scoring five goals in the process when he helped guide the club to second within the league at the end of the 2010 league season gaining immediate promotion back into the Chinese Super League.

On 2 January 2012, Zhang transferred to Chinese Super League side Guangzhou R&F. He would make his debut on 16 March 2012 in a league game against Guangzhou Evergrande F.C. that ended in a 2-0 victory. After the game he would go on to establish himself as a vital member of the team and by the 2014 Chinese Super League campaign he would aid the team to their highest ever league position of third and qualification for the AFC Champions League for the first time. After playing more than 100 times for the club, mainly on the right wing, on 26 February 2016 Zhang was loaned to China League One side Beijing Renhe until 31 December 2016.

In December 2016, Zhang transferred to China League One side Shenzhen FC. His debut appearance would be on 12 March 2017 against Dalian Transcendence F.C. in a league game that ended in a 6-0 victory. Immediately establishing himself as a vital member of the team he go on aid the club to gain promotion to the top tier at the end of the 2018 China League One campaign.

International career
After being scouted by Liu Chunming, he would include him in his squad that part in the 2008 AFC U-19 Championship where he would play three games and score one goal against Tajikistan in a tournament that saw China get knocked out in the quarter-finals. He would go on to be promoted to the Chinese under-23 national team and take part in the 2010 Asian Games, where he was used in defense by the manager Sun Wei, nevertheless he would go on to play in all four games for China where they were knocked out in the last sixteen. His promotion within the national team would continue when he made his debut for the Chinese national team on 6 September 2012 when he played in a friendly match against Sweden in a game that China lost 1-0.

Career statistics
Statistics accurate as of match played 31 December 2020.

References

External links
Player profile at Chengdu Blades website
Player stats at Sohu.com
 
 

Living people
1989 births
Chinese footballers
Footballers from Beijing
China international footballers
Chengdu Tiancheng F.C. players
Guangzhou City F.C. players
Beijing Renhe F.C. players
Shenzhen F.C. players
Chinese Super League players
China League One players
Footballers at the 2010 Asian Games
Association football midfielders
Asian Games competitors for China